Ramo Peter (Ray) Ceresino (April 24, 1929 – May 1, 2015) was a Canadian ice hockey left winger. He played 12 games for the Toronto Maple Leafs of the National Hockey League during the 1948–49 season. The rest of his career, which lasted from 1946 to 1957, was spent in the minor leagues.

On June 2, 1953, he married Lorraine Giardetti; they were married for 62 years. He moved his family to California in 1962 and settled in Los Angeles where he worked as a mortgage broker. He later retired to San Diego. He had three children, including Gordon Ceresino.

Career statistics

Regular season and playoffs

References

External links
 

1929 births
2015 deaths
Canadian ice hockey left wingers
Cleveland Barons (1937–1973) players
Ice hockey people from Ontario
Montreal Royals (QSHL) players
Oshawa Generals players
Providence Reds players
Pittsburgh Hornets players
Seattle Ironmen players
Sportspeople from Thunder Bay
Toronto Maple Leafs players
Victoria Cougars (1949–1961) players